90 Day Fiancé is an American reality television series on TLC.

Series overview

Spin-off timeline
This show has a lot of crossover, for that it's better put a timeline.
2014: 90DF season 1 and 90DF season 2
2015: 90DF season 3
autumn 2016: At the same time were shown 90DF season 4 and 90DF-HEA season 1
summer 2017: At the same time were shown 90DF-WN season 1 and 90DF-HEA season 2.
autumn 2017: At the same time were shown 90DF season 5 and 90DF-BT90D season 1.
spring 2018: 90DF-HEA season 3 
summer 2018: At the same time were shown 90DF-BT90D season 2 and 90DF-WN season 2 
winter 18-19 90DF season 6
spring 2019: At the same time were shown 90DF-WN season 3 and 90DF-HEA season 4. 
After that was shown 90DF-PT season 1 and The Family Chantel season 1.
summer 2019: 90DF-BF90D season 3
autumn 2019: At the same time were shown 90DF-TOW season 1 and 90DF-PT season 2.
winter 19-20 At the same time were shown 90DF season 7 and 90DF-PT season 3.
spring 2020: At the same time were show 90DF-WN season 4 and 90DF-B90D season 4.
summer 2020: At the same time were shown 90DF-HEA season 5 and 90DF-TOW season 2.
winter 20-21 At the same time were shown 90DF season 8 and The Family Chantel season 2.
spring 2021: 90DF-HEA season 6
After that was shown 90DF-BF90D season 5.

Episodes

Season 1 (2014)

Season 2 (2014)

Season 3 (2015)

Season 4 (2016)

Season 5 (2017)

Season 6 (2018–19)

Season 7 (2019–20)

Season 8 (2020–21)

Season 9 (2022)

Spin-offs

90 Day Fiancé: Happily Ever After? (2016–present)

90 Day Fiancé: Before the 90 Days (2017–present)
Season 1 (2017)

Season 2 (2018)

Season 3 (2019)

Season 4 (2020)

90 Day Fiancé: What Now? (2017–present)
Season 1 (2017)

Season 2 (2018)

Season 3 (2019)

This content was structured in 2 ways, depending if it was shown on TV or on the website. Episodes between 22 and 26 only are recaps

Season 4 (2020)

90 Day Fiancé: Pillow Talk (2019–present)
Season 1 (2019)

Season 2 (2019)

Season 3 (2019)

90 Day Fiancé: The Other Way (2019–present)
Season 1 (2019)

Season 2 (2020)

Season 3 (2021)

The Family Chantel (2019–present)

90 Day Fiancé: Just Landed (2019)

90 Day Fiancé: Self-Quarantined (2020–present)

B90 Strikes Back! (2020–present)

Darcey & Stacey (2020–present)

HEA Strikes Back! (2020–present)

90 Day Bares All (2021–present)

90 Day Diaries (2021–present)

90 Day Journey (2021–present)

The Other Way Strikes Back! (2021–present)

90 Day: The Single Life (2021–present)
Season 1 (2021)

Season 2 (2021-22)

Season 3 (2022)

90 Day Fiancé: Love Games (2021)

References

External links
 
 Everything About “90 Day Fiancé: Before the 90 Days” This Season at BuddyTV
 Everything You Need to Know About “90 Day: The Single Life” This Season at BuddyTV

Lists of American reality television series episodes